These hits topped the Dutch Top 40 in 1967.

See also
1967 in music

References

1967 in the Netherlands
1967 record charts
1967